Lebogang Mashile (born 7 February 1979) is a South African actress, writer and performance poet.

Biography
The daughter of exiled South African parents, Mashile was born in the United States and returned to South Africa in the mid-1990s after the end of apartheid. She began to study law and international relations at the University of the Witwatersrand but became more interested in the arts. With Myesha Jenkins, Ntsiki Mazwai and Napo Masheane, she founded the poetry group Feela Sistah.

She appeared in the 2004 film Hotel Rwanda and has performed in a number of theatre productions, including Threads, which combined dance, music and poetry. She also recorded a live performance album incorporating music and poetry, titled Lebo Mashile Live. She co-produced and hosted the documentary programme L’Attitude on SABC 1 and hosted a game show called Drawing the Line on SABC 2.

In 2005, she published her first poetry collection, In a Ribbon of Rhythm, for which she received the Noma Award in 2006.

Mashile and musician, performer, writer Majola released an EP in 2016.

Awards and honours
Mashile was named one of South Africa's Awesome Women of 2005 by Cosmopolitan and one of the Top 100 youth in South Africa by the Mail & Guardian in 2006, 2007 and 2009. In 2006, she was named the top personality in television by The Star in their annual Top 100 list, in 2007 she was the recipient of the City Press/Rapport Woman of Prestige Award, and was also named Woman of the Year for 2010 in the category of Arts and Culture by Glamour magazine. Mashile was cited as one of the Top 100 Africans by New African magazine in 2011 and in 2012 she won the Art Ambassador award at the inaugural Mbokodo Awards for South African Women in the Arts. Mashile performed at the Opening of Parliament in 2009. She has been described as "probably the first name that comes to mind when thinking about a female writer making colossal waves in the poetry space".

Selected works 
 In a Ribbon of Rhythm, poetry (Oshun Books, 2005)
 Flying Above the Sky, poetry (African Perspective, 2008)

References

External links
 

1979 births
Living people
21st-century South African actresses
South African women poets
South African television presenters
University of the Witwatersrand alumni
21st-century South African women writers
21st-century South African poets
South African women television presenters